Liška (feminine: Lišková) is a Czech surname meaning "fox". It may refer to:

 Ad Liska (1906–1998), American baseball player
 Adam Liška (born 1999), Slovak ice hockey player
 Allen Liska (1940–1998), American sociologist
 Alois Liška (1895–1977), Czech army officer who served in both World Wars
 Antonín Liška (1924–2003), Czech Roman Catholic clergyman
 Bernard J. Liska (1931–2002), American food scientist
 Emanuel Krescenc Liška (1852–1903), Czech painter and illustrator
 Hana Lišková (born 1952), Czech gymnast
 Hans Liska (1907–1983), Austrian-German artist
 Jan Kryštof Liška (c. 1650–1712), Czech painter
 Jiří Liška (disambiguation), multiple Czech individuals
 Ludvík Liška (1929–2021), Czech runner 
 Martin Liška (born 1976), Slovak cyclist
 Ondřej Liška (born 1977), Czech politician
 Pavel Liška (born 1972), Czech actor
 Stanislava Lišková (born 1997), Slovak footballer
 Věra Lišková (1924–1985), Czech glass artist
 Vivian Liska, American academic
 Zdeněk Liška (1922–1983), Czech composer

See also
 
 
 Lischka, a Germanized version of the surname
 Liska March (1906–2003), American dancer and actress
 Liska Tibor College for Advanced Studies, unit of the Budapest University of Technology, Hungary
 Liska is also an alternative name for Olaszliszka, a town in Hungary
 Liske (Hasidic dynasty), named for this town

Czech-language surnames
Surnames from nicknames